James Jefferson Wilson (1775July 28, 1824) was a  U.S. Senator from New Jersey from 1815 to 1821.

Biography
Wilson was born in Essex County, New Jersey, where he attended the common schools. He was editor and publisher of the True American of Trenton, New Jersey 1801–1824; clerk in the New Jersey General Assembly in 1804; judge advocate and captain, Hunterdon Brigade, New Jersey Militia, in 1806; surrogate of Hunterdon County, New Jersey in 1808; member of the General Assembly 1809–1811; brigadier general and Adjutant General of New Jersey from 1810–1812, and reappointed in 1814; captain in the Third Regiment, Hunterdon Brigade 1814; captain in the New Jersey Militia 1814; brigadier general and Quartermaster General of New Jersey from 1821 to 1824.

Wilson was elected as a Democratic-Republican to the United States Senate and served from March 4, 1815, to January 8, 1821, when he resigned; was an unsuccessful candidate for reelection; chairman of the Committee on Post Office and Post Roads (Fourteenth and Fifteenth Congresses), Committee on Claims (Sixteenth Congress); appointed Postmaster of Trenton, New Jersey, in 1821 and served until his death in that city; interment in the First Baptist Church Cemetery, Trenton.

External links

James Jefferson Wilson at The Political Graveyard

Bibliography
 Wilson, James Jefferson, comp. A National Song-Book, Being a Collection of Patriotic, Martial, and Naval Songs and Odes. Trenton, N.J.: James J. Wilson, 1813.

1775 births
1824 deaths
Members of the New Jersey General Assembly
United States senators from New Jersey
New Jersey Democratic-Republicans
Democratic-Republican Party United States senators
Quartermasters General of New Jersey
People from Essex County, New Jersey